Iulia Yevhenivna Paratova (also transliterated Yuliya, born 7 November 1986 in Odessa) is a Ukrainian weightlifter. She competed at the 2012 Summer Olympics in the Women's 53 kg, finishing 3rd after gold medallist Zulfiya Chinshanlo and bronze medallist Cristina Iovu were both disqualified. Paratova also competed for Ukraine at the 2016 Summer Olympics.

References

External links
 
 
 
 

1986 births
Living people
Ukrainian female weightlifters
Olympic weightlifters of Ukraine
Olympic bronze medalists for Ukraine
Olympic medalists in weightlifting
Weightlifters at the 2012 Summer Olympics
Weightlifters at the 2016 Summer Olympics
Medalists at the 2012 Summer Olympics
European Weightlifting Championships medalists
Sportspeople from Odesa
21st-century Ukrainian women